Martinetti is a surname. Notable people with this surname include:

 Angelo Martinetti (1830-date of death unknown), Italian painter, mainly of still-lives depicting game
 Daniele Martinetti (born 1981) is an Italian footballer 
 David Martinetti (born 1970), Swiss wrestler
 Étienne Martinetti (1940-2002), Swiss wrestler
 Grégory Martinetti (born 1972), Swiss wrestler
 Jimmy Martinetti (born 1946), Swiss former wrestler
 León Martinetti (1926–1999), Argentine basketball player
 Maria Martinetti (1864–1921), Italian painter
 Nella Martinetti (1946–2011), Swiss singer-songwriter
 Nicolas Martinetti (born 1989), French professional football player
 Paul Martinetti (1846–1924), French-American pantomimist and entertainer, who settled in Britain
 Piero Martinetti (1872–1943), Italian philosopher
 Raphaël Martinetti, Swiss President of the International Federation of Associated Wrestling Styles

 In fiction 
 Luis Martinetti, Contortionist, a 1894 short film produced by the Edison Manufacturing Company

See also 
 Martinelli